Arvind Gaur is an Indian theatre director known for innovative, socially and politically relevant plays in India. Gaur's plays are contemporary and thought-provoking, connecting intimate personal spheres of existence to larger social political issues. His work deals with Internet censorship, communalism, caste issues, feudalism, domestic violence, crimes of state, politics of power, violence, injustice, social discrimination, marginalisation, and racism. Arvind is the leader of Asmita, Delhi's "most prolific theatre group", and is an actor trainer, social activist, street theatre worker and story teller.

Gaur was the recipient of a research fellowship awarded by the Ministry of Human Resource Development (India) (1997–98). He was on the guest faculty of Delhi University for Theatre in education program for three years. He has conducted many theatre workshops and performed in colleges, institutions, universities and schools in India and abroad.

He organizes theatre workshops for children in schools and slums as well as street theatre performances on socio-political issues. He has directed more than hundreds stage and street plays over 25 years.

Personal life 
He was born on 2 February 1963 in Delhi. Arvind's father Late. Shri Shiva Nandan Sharma was a Mathematics scholar and his mother Late. Saraswati Devi was a housewife. His father died on 16 April 2009 and his mother died on 19 September 2019. He has one brother Anil Gaur and three sisters: Shashi Prabha, late Mithlesh and Dr. Anita Gaur. He is married to Dr. Sangeeta Gaur. He has twins daughters Kakoli Gaur Nagpal and Saveree Gaur. Prince Nagpal is his son-in-law. He married his daughter Kakoli Gaur.

Theatre career 
After completing his schooling from Model School, Vivek Vihar in Delhi, he decided to study engineering in Electronic Communication. Later, he joined the Delhi Public Library drama group. In DPL He acted in and directed plays. Then he worked with slum kids and industrial labourers for some time and conducted workshops for them. His first street play was with Zakir Hussein College, called Videshi Aya. It became very popular and he staged it around 200 schools. After this, his desire to express led him to journalism. He worked with the Navbharat Times newspaper as culture columnist for about four years.

Watching plays, reading about them and writing about them is how his training in theatre started. He then shifted to Press Trust of India (PTI-TV). He was associated with TV serial Tana-Bana. He was in charge of the research and programming there. All through his years with street theatre, print and television, Gaur had developed keen interest in direction. Finally, after devoting two years to PTI-TV, he felt the urge to switch to theatre completely.

Arvind's debut play was Bhisham Sahni's Hanoosh (February, 1993). He started his theatre journey with classics like Tughlaq, Andha Yug, Caligula, Julius Caesar, etc.

He performed Girish Karnad's Tughlaq in a small basement theatre (SRC). It was a huge success. His Tughlaq was selected as "the best play of the year 1994" by Sahitya Kala Parishad. He achieved greater heights during a decade in theatre. He trained actors in his own style. He trained them as a complete theatre person. Arvind Gaur also collaborated with theatre artists and groups specially in exploring a new language for solo performances.

Major directions 
 Girish Karnad's Tughlaq translations by B. V. Karanth, Surekha Sikri & K.K. Nayyar
 Bhisham Sahni's Hanoosh
 Dharamvir Bharati's Andha Yug (The Age of Blindness)
 Swadesh Deepak's Court Martial (450 shows)
 Govind Deshpande's Antim Divas, translated in Hindi by Chandra kant patil
 Albert Camus's Caligula (play), translation by Sharad Chandra
 Girish Karnad's Rakt Kalyan (Taledanda), Hindi Translation by Ram Gopal Bajaj
 Bertolt Brecht's The Caucasian Chalk Circle translated by Kamleshwar
 Mahesh Dattani's Final Solutions, translation by Shahid Anwar
 Eugene O'Neill's Desire Under the Elms translated by Nadira Babbar
 Dario Fo's Operation Three Star, adaptation of Accidental Death of an Anarchist by Amitabh Srivatava
 Dr. Narendra Mohan's Kalandar & Mr.Jinnah
 Samuel Beckett's Waiting For Godot, translation Krishna Bal Dev Vaid
 John Octanasek's Romeo Juliet and the darkness, script by Aishveryaa Nidhi
 Neil Simon's The Good Doctor, Adaptation - Sunil Jasuja, Sadia & Aparna Singh
 Vijay Tendulkar's Ghashiram Kotwal
 Sharad Joshi's Andhon ka Hathi & Ek tha Gadha urf aladat Khan
 Munshi Premchand's Mote ram ka Satyagrah, Adaptation by Habib Tanvir and Safdar Hashmi
 Ashok Lal's Ek Mamooli Aadmi
 Nag Bodas's Amma Tujhe salaam
 Rajesh Kumar's Me Gandhi Bolto
 William Shakespeare's Julius Caesar
 Mahesh Dattani's Tara, translation by Neeraj Mallik
 Vijay Mishra's Tatt Niranjana, translation by Rajendra Prasad Mishra
 Doodnath Singh's Yama Gatha
 Uday Prakash's Warren Hastings ka Saand
 Dr. Harish Naval's Peeli Chht par Kaala Nissan
 Bhisham Sahni's Kabira ( Kabir ) kheda Bazar Mai
 Mahesh Dattani's 30 Days in September, Hindi translation by Smita Nirula
 Bharatendu Harishchandra's Andher Nagri
 Harsh Mander's Unsuni, script by Mallika Sarabhai
 Rajesh Kumar's Ambedkar Aur Gandhi Nominated for the best play, best direction and best ensemble in the Mahindra Excellence in Theatre Awards-2011
 Mohan Rakesh's Leheron Ke Raj Hans
 Bertolt Brecht's The Good Person of Szechwan 'Ramkali', adaptation by Amitabh Srivastava, starring Mallika Sarabhai and Revanta Sarabhai (34th Vikram Sarabhai International Art Festival)
 Gulzar's Kharaashein, play based on his poetries and stories
 Govind Purushottam Deshpande's Raastey. Hindi translation by Jyoti Subhash
 Mahesh Bhatt's The Last Salute, written by Rajesh Kumar.Play based on Muntadhar al-Zaidi's Book.
 Partition play based on Saadat Hasan Manto's stories
 Dario Fo's 'Chukayenge Nahi' Can't Pay? Won't Pay!, Hindi adaptation by Amitabh Srivastava
 Rajesh Kumar's play 'Trial of Errors'

Solo play direction 
Bhisham Sahni's Madhavi solo play with Rashi Bunny
Untitled, solo with Lushin Dubey (Theatre World)
Manjula Padmanabhan's Hidden Fires, with Rashi Bunny
Gandhari ... in search of light, solo with Aishveryaa Nidhi
Sarah Kane's 4.48 Psychosis by Ruth Sheard
Women in Black, one-woman show written  & acted by Bubbles Sabharwal
Antoine de Saint-Exupéry's The Little Prince, one-woman show by Rashi Bunny
Pinki Virani's Bitter Chocolate solo by Lushin Dubey
Walking through the Rainbow, with Rashi Bunny
Story of the Tiger, with Jaimini Kumar Srivastava
A Woman Alone, solo with Ruth Sheard in English.
'I Will Not Cry', solo with Lushin Dubey
Aruna's Story solo play with Lushin Dubey based on Pinki Virani's book on Nurse Aruna Shanbaug case

Street plays 
Gaur directed more than 40 street theatre performances on socio-political issues. He has always raised voice against any socio-political issue that effects the common public. He directed street plays like Corruption, Garbage, Road Rage, and Dastak which is against the issue of eve teasing. His street plays are always thought-provoking and leave a huge mark on the mindset. He and his team performs socio-political street plays all across Delhi/NCR and the country. He is regarded as a man with a message who believes that change can start from society, if we wish to start the change.

Awards 
 Special Honour Award by Delhi International Film festival 2015

films/visual media 
 Acted in Raanjhanaa as Guptaji directed by Aanand L. Rai
 Acted in JD film directed by Shailendra Pandey with Govind Namdev, Aman Verma, Vedita Pratap Singh
 acted in Gurgaon
 Acted in short film "Meri Jeevan ki Abhilasha" directed by Kriti Takkar which won second best fiction film in "Mise-en-Scene", the international student's film festival, 2010.
 Assistant director, docu-film "In search of an ideology", director Prasanna for Doordarshan, Ministry of Information and Broadcasting (India).
 Worked with Press Trust of India (PTI-TV).
 Acted in tele-film Dhabba directed by Green Oscar awardee Mike Pandey, produced by Nafisa Ali.
 Assistant director, docu-film Gokak (V. K. Gokak), director Prasanna for Sahitya Akademi, Delhi.
 Research and scripting for TV serial Taana-Bana (1991–1992), produced by Press Trust of India.

Translation and Scripting

Translation
He translated Rabindranath Tagore's Visarjan (Sacrifice), performed by the Darpana Theatre Group directed by Ujjwal Dave
Arvind Gaur translated Unsuni in Hindi; script and direction by Mallika Sarabhai

Scripts
He scripted plays like Untitled, Gandhari...in search of light, I will not Cry, Bitter Chocolate (based on Pinki Virani's book), Madhavi solo play (based on Bhisham Sahni's play) and many street plays for Asmita Theatre.

Design
Arvind Gaur designs lights for Naya Theatre group's major productions under the direction of Padma Shri Habib Tanvir. Gaur also assisted Shri Habib Tanvir during the Prithvi Theatre Festival. He designs lights for Agra Bazar Nazeer Akbarabadi 's poetry), Charandas Chor (his masterpiece play, Edinburgh Fringe Award), Asghar Wajahat's Jis Lahore Nai Dekhya, Kamdeo ka Apna Basant Ritu ka Sapna (Habib Tanvir's adaptation of Shakespeare's A Midsummer Night's Dream), Canadian-Indian playwright Rahul Varma's Zahreeli Hawa and Gaon ke naon Sasural, mor naon Damand.

Major Actors
Major cinema and theatre actors who trained under Arvind Gaur are Kangana Ranaut, Deepak Dobriyal, Manu Rishi, Shilpa Shukla, Rashi Bunny, Aishveryaa Nidhi, Tillotama Shome, Imran Zahid, Sheena Chohan, Seema Azmi, Ishwak Singh 
and Suraj Singh of Veere Di Wedding fame. Sonam Kapoor attended Gaur's acting workshop to learn the nuances of street theatre for her film Raanjhanaa.
Other prominent theatre actors who worked with him are Mallika Sarabhai, Piyush Mishra, Lushin Dubey, Bubbles Sabharwal, Ruth Sheard, Jaimini Kumar, etc.

Further reading 
"Arvind Gaur-A Decade in Theatre" by J.N. Kaushal (ex-Acting Chief, National School of Drama, Repertory Company), published by ITI (International Theatre Institute), UNESCO, Indian Chapter
"Raising the curtain on theatre": Director Arvind Gaur reflects on why India needs a cultural policy by Seema Sindhu (Life Fires, September, 2007)
His Voice-"Ace Act", essay by Shekhar Chandran (New Women, Jan. 2008)
"The World of Theatre" by Ian Herbert, Nicole Leclercq (P-126) published by International Theatre Institute

References

External links 

 The good man of Delhi stage by Archana (2008-09-26) Mail-Today.
 Founder of Asmita Group, by Rohit Malik, Delhi Events (2008.12.30)
 Gandhari, solo-act by Aishveryaa Nidhi
 "All The World’s A Platform" by Shailaja Tripathi. Expressindia ,( 2003.09.17)
 "Heal the wounds" by Rohini Ramakrishan,(2004/12/11), The Hindu
 Dramatics Society of Lady Shri Ram College
 "A plethora of problems afflicts Hindi theatre" Rana A Siddiqui, The Tribune.(2001.12.28)
 "Mahesh Dattani's Final Solutions"Oneness Peace Festival, Hindu College, University of Delhi (2005.09.16)
 "Play of rules-Arvind Gaur's street theatre-Hatke Bachke"Nandini Nair, The Hindu (2009.01.12)
 "Nobody’s Child-Bitter Chocolate" Express Features Service, The Indian Express (2004.01.08)
 "The Park’s The Other Festival"Onassis Awardee Manjula Padmanabhan's "Hidden fires"-The Museum Theatre, Chennai (2005.12.07) 
 Asmita Theatre Group

1963 births
Living people
Indian theatre directors
Indian drama teachers
Indian storytellers
Postmodern theatre
Indian human rights activists
Activists from Delhi
Hindi theatre